The 1978 American 500 was a NASCAR Winston Cup Series race that took place on October 22, 1978, at North Carolina Motor Speedway in Rockingham, North Carolina. Four hundred and ninety-two laps were done on a paved oval track spanning . Forty-six thousand people would attend the race live to see 36 cars (and only 19 of them finish the race). Other notable drivers included: Darrell Waltrip (who went on to be a NASCAR announcer for FOX), Benny Parsons, Richard Petty, Richard Childress, and J.D. McDuffie (who would die at Watkins Glen during a racing event in the 1991 NASCAR Winston Cup Series season).

North Carolina Motor Speedway was affectionately referred to at the time as The Action Track; delivering much action from motorcycle racing to stock car events. The Baby Grand 125 was an ARCA (Automobile Racing Club of America) companion race that took place the previous day. People could buy the official program during both races at a relatively low price of $3 USD ($ when adjusted for inflation).

Race report
Cale Yarborough won the race's pole position and would eventually go onto leading 376 laps of the 492 that were actually done. Bobby Allison lost to Yarborough by more than two laps. Cale Yarborough automatically clinched his third straight NASCAR Winston Cup championship as a result of winning this race.

As a result of recent rule changes brought about by the implementation of an organized NASCAR playoffs system in the 21st century; this situation is no longer possible under the current NASCAR regime. Bobby Wawak drove Richard Childress Backup car in this race.

The racing entries were mostly made of Chevrolet vehicles with very few Ford and Dodge entries. Four hours, fifteen minutes, and fifty-eight seconds was the duration of the entire race. The first green flag was waved at noon while the checkered flag was waved at approximately 4:15 P.M.. Engine problems were dominant in the race with only Bill Hollar actually quitting the race for "personal reasons." Donnie Allison would become ill after leading 12 laps and would drop out of the race; no relief driver was ever found. Five cautions slowed the race for 52 laps and Baxter Price (in his Chevrolet Chevelle Laguna) was the lowest driver to actually finish the race.

Joe Frasson would finish his NASCAR Cup Series career by participating in this race and finishing in 23rd place after starting in 25th place (improving his position by two places). Charlie Blanton and Johnny Halford would also retire from NASCAR after this race. Frasson drove the race using a self-owned #18 vehicle with a 1978 Buick Century as his manufacturer and model. The number would be transferred over to a Chevrolet machine when it was transferred to Joe Gibbs Racing starting in the 1992 Daytona 500 and remains with JGR to the present day. The number in question would ultimately become synonymous with Kyle Busch's Toyota Camry starting in 2008. Top prize at this race would be $23,360 in American dollars ($ when adjusted for inflation).

Qualifying

Finishing order
Section reference:

 Cale Yarborough (No. 11)
 Bobby Allison (No. 15)
 Darrell Waltrip (No. 88)
 Benny Parsons† (No. 72)
 Dick Brooks† (No. 90)
 Richard Petty (No. 43)
 Lennie Pond (No. 54)
 Dave Marcis (No. 2)
 Buddy Arrington (No. 67)
 Richard Childress (No. 3)
 Dick May† (No. 92)
 J.D. McDuffie† (No. 70)
 Jimmy Means (No. 52)
 James Hylton† (No. 48)
 Cecil Gordon† (No. 24)
 Frank Warren (No. 79)
 Gary Myers (No. 4)
 Tommy Gale† (No. 64)
 Baxter Price (No. 45)
 Donnie Allison* (No. 1)
 Tighe Scott* (No. 30)
 Buddy Baker*† (No. 27)
 Joe Frasson*† (No. 18)
 David Pearson* (No. 21)
 Ricky Rudd* (No. 22)
 Roger Hamby* (No. 17)
 Bobby Wawak*† (No. 31)
 Junior Miller* (No. 95)
 Elmo Langley*† (No. 19)
 Johnny Halford* (No. 87)
 Neil Bonnett*† (No. 5)
 Charlie Blanton* (No. 59)
 Ronnie Thomas* (No. 25)
 Ferrel Harris*† (No. 81)
 Ed Negre* (No. 8)
 Bill Hollar*† (No. 28)

† Driver is known to be deceased 
* Driver failed to finish race

Standings after the race

References

American 500
American 500
NASCAR races at Rockingham Speedway